Afro-Cuban is an album by American jazz trumpeter Kenny Dorham. The first release of the album dates back to 1955 on 10" Vinyl, featuring only four tracks and having a different cover artwork. Some time later, Blue Note decided to add three tracks and issue a more complete LP toward the end of May 1957 (see below for details). After publishing a 2003 RVG edition which featured two additional pieces and a different track listing, Blue Note remastered and recompiled Afro-Cuban in 2007, restoring the original track order.

Reception

The Allmusic review by Michael G. Nastos stated: "A first-rate recording for the under-appreciated Dorham, this one should be in every collection of all true music lovers".

Track listing
All compositions by Kenny Dorham except as indicated

10" Vinyl, BLP 5065 (1955)
 "Afrodisia" – 5:06
 "Lotus Flower" – 4:17
 "Minor's Holiday" – 4:27
 "Basheer's Dream" (Gigi Gryce) - 5:03

LP, BLP 1535 (1957)
 "Afrodisia" – 5:06
 "Lotus Flower" – 4:17
 "Minor's Holiday" – 4:27
 "Basheer's Dream" (Gigi Gryce) - 5:03
 "K.D.'s Motion" - 5:29
 "La Villa" – 5:24
 "Venita's Dance" - 5:22

RVG edition (CD, 2007)
 "Afrodisia" – 5:06
 "Lotus Flower" – 4:17
 "Minor's Holiday" – 4:27
 "Basheer's Dream" (Gigi Gryce) - 5:03
 "K.D.'s Motion" - 5:29
 "La Villa" – 5:24
 "Venita's Dance" - 5:22

Bonus tracks
"Echo of Spring" (aka "K.D.'s Cab Ride") – 6:12
"Minor's Holiday" [Alternate Take] – 4:24

Tracks 5-8 recorded on January 30, 1955; tracks 1-4 and 9 on March 29, 1955.

Personnel
Kenny Dorham – trumpet
J. J. Johnson – trombone (tracks 1-4 and 9)
Hank Mobley – tenor saxophone
Cecil Payne – baritone saxophone
Horace Silver – piano
Percy Heath (tracks 5-8), Oscar Pettiford (tracks 1-4 and 9) – bass
Art Blakey – drums
Carlos "Patato" Valdes – conga (tracks 1-4 and 9)
Richie Goldberg – cowbell (tracks 1-4 and 9)

References

Blue Note Records albums
Albums produced by Alfred Lion
Kenny Dorham albums
1955 albums
Albums recorded at Van Gelder Studio
Afro-Cuban jazz albums